Évariste may refer to:

Alexandre-Évariste Fragonard (1780–1850), French painter and sculptor
Évariste Boshab (born 1956), Congolese politician
Évariste Carpentier (1845–1922), Belgian painter
Evariste Djimasdé, Chadian footballer
Évariste Galois (1811–1832), French mathematician
Évariste Régis Huc (1813–1860), French missionary traveller
Évariste Jonchère (1892–1956), French sculptor
Évariste Kimba (1926–1966), Congolese journalist and politician
Pierre-Évariste Leblanc, KCMG (1853–1918), Quebec Conservative Party leader
Évariste Vital Luminais (1822–1896), French painter
Évariste Ndayishimiye (born 1968), Burundian politician
Évariste de Parny (1753–1814), French writer
Évariste Prat (1904–1970), French cross-country skier
Saint-Évariste-de-Forsyth, Quebec, municipality in Canada
Évariste, 2015 novel by François-Henri Désérable